Gabriel Veraldi, real name William Schmidt (1926 in Annecy – 23 April 2009) was a Swiss French-speaking writer and translator. Veraldi is the author of several novels and essays.

Works

Novels 
1953: À la mémoire d'un ange, Éditions Gallimard NRF
1954: La Machine humaine, NRF (Prix Femina)
1956: Le Chasseur captif, NRF
1919: L’Affaire, Julliard Éditions Denoël
1966: Les Espions de bonne volonté, Denoël
1968: À la mémoire d'un ange
1969: L'Affaire

Essays 
1958: L’Humanisme technique, La Table Ronde
1965: Histoire du matérialisme, Planète
1971: L’Inconscient pour et contre, with André Akoun, Denoël
1972: La Psychologie de la création, with Brigitte André, Denoël
1978: Guérir par l'eau
1981: Longévité et immortalité selon la tradition et la science, Vernoy
1980: Planète, Éditions du Rocher, (collection of texts)
1983: Le Roman d'espionnage, PUF (Que sais-je ?)
1988: Infant Feeding, Anatomy of a Controversy, with John Dobbing et M. McComas, Springer
1989: Pauwels ou le malentendu, Éditions Grasset
1989: Dieu est-il contre l'économie?, with Jacques Paternot
2000: Le Dernier Pape, with Jacques Paternot
2002: La Science face à l'énigme des ovnis, with Peter Sturrock
2006: La Conscience invisible : Le paranormal à l'épreuve de la science, with Dean Radin, Véronique Lesueur
2006: La Psycho-physique : vers un humanisme scientifique : Entretiens avec Gabriel Veraldi, with Marcel Odier

Translations 
 1966: Le Masque de Dimitrios by Eric Ambler
 1978: Les Trafiquants d'armes by Eric Ambler

References

External links 
 Une religion sans révélation
 Photograph on Paris en Images
 Gabriel Verardi on K-Libre
 Le Dernier Pape with Jacques Paternot on biblisem.net

1926 births
2009 deaths
20th-century Swiss writers
21st-century Swiss writers
Swiss essayists
20th-century essayists
English–French translators
Prix Femina winners
20th-century translators